Dadwala is a town of Bahawalpur District in the Punjab province of eastern Pakistan.  Neighbouring settlements include Faqirwali and Najwaniwala.

References

Populated places in Bahawalpur District